Somerville is a residential suburb of Kalgoorlie-Boulder, a city in the Eastern Goldfields region of Western Australia.

References